Stefania Croce (born 17 May 1970) is an Italian professional golfer, who plays on the Ladies European Tour (LET), and is a former member of the LPGA Tour.  Croce qualified for the LPGA Tour on her second attempt in doing so in 1993.  Croce won one tournament on the LET, which the win came at the 1992 Ford Ladies' Classic.  She is best known for coming in second to Juli Inkster at the 2000 LPGA Championship, which she lost in a playoff on the second hole.

Professional wins (1)

Ladies European Tour (1)
1992 Ford Ladies' Classic

Team appearances
Amateur
European Ladies' Team Championship (representing Italy): 1985, 1989
Vagliano Trophy (representing Continent of Europe): 1987
Espirito Santo Trophy (representing Italy): 1986, 1988

References

External links

Italian female golfers
Ladies European Tour golfers
LPGA Tour golfers
Sportspeople from Bergamo
1970 births
Living people